Félix Manuel García Casas (born December 29, 1968 in Madrid) is a Spanish former professional road cyclist.

Career
He competed in four editions of the Tour de France, 10 of the Vuelta a España, and three of the Giro d'Italia. His sons Raúl and Carlos are also professional cyclists.

Major results

1991
2nd Overall Circuito Montañés
1994
3rd Overall Escalada a Montjuïc
3rd Overall Vuelta a Asturias
1995
1st GP Miguel Indurain
1996
3rd Overall Tour of Chile
1st stage 1
1997
2nd Overall Tour of Chile
1st stage 1
2001
2nd Overall Tour de Romandie
3rd Trofeo Alcudia
3rd Overall Vuelta a Mallorca
2002
2nd Escalada a Montjuïc
8th Overall Vuelta a España
2003
3rd LuK Challenge Chrono

Grand Tour general classification results timeline

References

External links

1968 births
Living people
Spanish male cyclists
Cyclists from Madrid